MS Wolin is a train, car and passenger ferry owned by the Polish Unity Line. She was built in 1986 as MS Öresund for the Swedish State Railways. Between 2002 and 2007 she sailed for SeaWind Line as MS Sky Wind, after which she was sold to her current owners.

References

External links

 SeaWind Line

1986 ships
Ferries of Sweden
Ferries of Poland